Kabi Kabi, also spelt Gabi-Gabi/Gubbi Gubbi, is a language of Queensland in Australia, formerly spoken by the Kabi Kabi people of South-east Queensland. The main dialect, Kabi Kabi, is extinct, but there are still 24 people with knowledge of the Butchulla dialect (also spelt Batjala, Batyala, Badjala, and variants), a language spoken by the Butchulla people of Fraser Island.

Words
According to Norman Tindale (1974), the word Kabi (['kabi]), means "no".

"Wunya ngulum" means "Welcome, everyone" in Kabi Kabi/Gabi-Gabi.

Language status
The main dialect is extinct, but there were still 24 people with knowledge of the Batjala dialect (a language spoken by the Butchulla people of Fraser Island) as of the 2016 Australian census.

Phonology
The following is in the Badjala/Butchulla dialect:

Consonants 

 /n̪/ is always heard as palatal [ɲ] when preceding /i/, and in word-final position.
 /d̪/ can be heard in free variation with palatal [ɟ].
 /b d̪ ɡ/ can have lenited allophones [β ð ɣ] in intervocalic positions.
 /ɻ/ has a lateral allophone of [ɭ] when preceding /b/.
 /ɡ/ is often slightly palatalised as [ɡʲ] before /i/.

Vowels 

  can sometimes be heard as  before .
  can be heard as  when preceding an intervocalic .

References

External links 
 Bibliography of Gabi Gabi people and language resources, at the Australian Institute of Aboriginal and Torres Strait Islander Studies
Heritage of Kabi Kabi people - Sunshine Coast Tourism Information Centre  
Joyce Bonner digital story, State Library of Queensland. Digital story discussing the Badtjala dialect
Eve Fesl digital story, State Library of Queensland. Digital story discussing the Gubbi Gubbi language  

Waka–Kabic languages
Extinct languages of Queensland
Critically endangered languages